Great is a British 28-minute animated short film released in 1975, telling a humorous version of the life of Isambard Kingdom Brunel. It was directed by Bob Godfrey, produced by Grantstern Films and distributed by British Lion.

Great won the Academy Award for Best Animated Short Film at the 48th Academy Awards in March 1976, making it the first British animated film to do so. Great also won the BAFTA award for Best Animated Film in that same year.

Background
The film recounts the life and works of the 19th century British civil engineer and architect Isambard Kingdom Brunel in a way that is affectionate while often tongue-in-cheek. The narrator, voiced by Harry Fowler, explains the triumphs and setbacks of Brunel's career, comparing him to Archimedes, Isaac Newton and Albert Einstein. Richard Briers provides the voice of Brunel. There are numerous songs in the film, including "Get a big top hat if you want to get ahead".

Production
Great is primarily an animated film, although it is mixed media, combining some live action sequences with the animation.

In an interview with The Guardian in April 2001, Bob Godfrey explained how the film came about:I'd been reading a book about Brunel so I asked British Lion, who backed Kama Sutra [Rides Again], if I could have some money to make a half-hour cartoon about a Victorian engineer. Yes, they said, here's £20,000. They thought the sun shone out of my arse at the time. They'd have given me money to animate a toilet if I'd asked them.

Availability 
Great has not been released on home video formats such as VHS or DVD with the official website of The Bob Godfrey Collection stating that this was due to the film's copyright status. The film was made available as a digital download in January 2017.

References

External links
 
Excerpt of Great posted by the Bob Godfrey Collection on YouTube
MUBI

1975 films
1975 animated films
1975 short films
1970s animated short films
1970s biographical films
Best Animated Short Academy Award winners
Films directed by Bob Godfrey
British animated short films
Animated films about trains
Films set in the 19th century
Collage film
1970s English-language films
1970s British films